Carl H. Moneyhon is a history professor emeritus and author in the United States. He received his Ph.D from University of Chicago in 1973 with a thesis "The Republican Party and Texas politics 1865-1874.

He works at the University of Arkansas in Little Rock and has published numerous papers and books. The Arkansas Democrat Gazette described him as a Civil War expert.

Moneyhon has written entries for the Texas State Historical Association and received a fellowship from it.

Writings
Republicanism in Reconstruction Texas. Texas A&M University Press.  (1979)
The Impact of Civil War and Reconstruction on Arkansas: Persistence in the Midst of Ruin   University of Arkansass Press (1994)
Arkansas and the New South 1874–1929 The University of Arkansas Press, Fayettevile, 1997
Texas after the Civil War : the struggle of Reconstruction  Texas A & M University Press (2004)
Edmund J. Davis of Texas : Civil War general, Republican leader, Reconstruction governor . Texas Christian University (2010)
A photographic history of Louisiana in the Civil War with Bobby Leon Roberts. University of Arkansas Press (1990)
A Photographic History of Ariansas in the Civil War with Bobby Leon Roverts. University of Arkansas Press (1998)
A Photographic History of Texas in the Civil War with Bobby Leon Roberts. University of Arkansas Press
George T. Ruby: Champion of Equal Rights in Reconstruction Texas. ,  Fort Worth Center for Texas Studies and TCU Press (2020)

The Union League and Biracial Politics in Reconstruction Texas.  Texas A&M University Press, 2021.

Papers
"Black Politics in Arkansas during the Gilded Age 1876 - 1900"
He also wrote a number of biographical entries for the American National Biography Online.

References

University of Chicago alumni
University of Arkansas faculty
Year of birth missing (living people)
Living people
Place of birth missing (living people)